Beetle is an unincorporated community located in Carter County, Kentucky, United States.

The origin of the name "Beetle" is obscure.

References

Unincorporated communities in Carter County, Kentucky
Unincorporated communities in Kentucky